Jacques Blondeau (alternative names: Jacomo Blondel, Hansje Blondeau, Jacobus Blondeau, Jean Jacques Blondeau, Jacques Blondel and nickname: Weyman) (Antwerp, 9 May 1655 - Rome, 1698) was a Flemish Baroque engraver who after training in Antwerp spent most of his career in Italy.

Life
He was a pupil of the Antwerp engraver Frederik Bouttats the Younger.  He spent some time in Paris. In 1675 he traveled to Rome where he continued to live and work for the rest of his life.

He became a member of the Bentvueghels, an association of mainly Dutch and Flemish artists working in Rome.  His nickname in the Bentvueghels was Weyman, meaning 'Meadow man'. Blondeau was a very active member of the association and his name appears twice in the history of the Bentvueghels. He wrote his  name in red chalk in one of the niches in the church of Santa Costanza where the Bentvueghels used to congregate: jacobus Blondeau / alias de weymyn. His name also appears on a list of members of the Bentvueghels, who were present at the inauguration of the new members Abraham Genoels II, François Moens and Pieter Verbrugghen II. This inauguration is also mentioned by early biographer Arnold Houbraken.

Work
He engraved several portraits, including that of Pope Urban VIII and various cardinals in Rome.

He spent some time in Firenze where he is said to have made several engravings, together with Abraham Bloemaert and François Spierre after the frescos by Pietro da Cortona in the Palazzo Pitti.

References

1655 births
1698 deaths
17th-century engravers
Flemish engravers
Artists from Antwerp
Members of the Bentvueghels